Mongolia participated in the 16th Asian Games in Guangzhou, China from 12 November to 27 November 2010.

Medal summary

Medals by sport

Medalists

Basketball

Boxing

Judo

Shooting

Wrestling

See also
2010 Asian Games medal table

External links

Nations at the 2010 Asian Games
2010
Asian Games